The Counts of Dreux were a noble family of France, who took their title from the chief stronghold of their domain, the château  of Dreux, which lies near the boundary between Normandy and the Île-de-France. They are notable for inheriting the Duchy of Brittany through Pierre de Dreux's marriage to Alix de Thouars in the early 13th century.

History
In the tenth century the lands belonged to the forebears of the Capetians; they passed by marriage to Walter, Count of the Vexin, then to Richard I of Normandy. In 1017 the lands were given as dowry to Richard's illegitimate daughter Matilda, who married Odo II, Count of Blois.

King Robert II of France confiscated the lands of Dreux from Odo, and they formed part of the royal domain until Louis the Fat granted the county of Dreux as an appanage to his son Robert. The descendants of Robert held the county of Dreux until 1355, when the heiress, Countess Joan II of Dreux, married Simon de Thouars. Simon and Joan had three daughters and no sons; their daughters sold their interests in the county of Dreux to King Charles VI.

King Charles gave the county of Dreux as a dowry in the marriage of his kinswoman Marguerite de Bourbon, daughter of Peter, Duke of Bourbon and of Isabella de Valois, daughter of Charles of Valois, with Arnaud-Amanieu d'Albret in 1382. The county returned to the crown in 1556, and thereafter formed part of the royal domain, then the lands of François, Duke of Anjou, and after his death was sold to the Duke of Nemours. It returned to the royal domain in the reign of Louis XV.

List of counts of Dreux

Capetian House of Dreux

|width=auto| Robert I the Great1137–1184
| 
| c. 1123fifth son of Louis VI of France and Adélaide of Maurienne 
| (1) Agnes of Garlande (1122–1143), daughter of Anseau de Garlande, Count of Rochefort; married 1139/41, one son  (2) Hawise of Salisbury (1118 – 13 Jan 1152), daughter of Walter Fitz Edward of Salisbury, Sheriff of Wiltshire; married 1144/45, one daughter  (3) Agnes of Baudemont (1130 – 24 July 1204), daughter of Guy de Baudement, Count of Braine; married 1152, ten children
| 11 October 1188Braineaged 64–65
|-
|width=auto| Robert II1184–1218
| 
| c. 1154eldest son of Robert and Agnes of Baudemont
| (1) Matilda of Burgundy1178no issue(2) Yolande of Coucy1184twelve children
| 28 December 1218Braineaged 63–64
|-
|width=auto| Robert III Gasteblé1218–1234
| 
| c. 1185eldest son of Robert II and Yolande of Coucy 
| Aénor of Saint-Valery1210four children
| 3 March 1234Braineaged 48–49
|-
|width=auto| John I1234–1249
| 
| c. 1215eldest son of Robert III and Aénor of Saint-Valery 
| Marie of Bourbon-DampierreApril 1240three children
| c. 1249Nicosiaaged 33–34
|-
|width=auto| Robert IV1249–1282
| 
| c. 1241eldest son of John I and Marie of Bourbon-Dampierre
| Beatrice of Montfort1260six children
| 12 November 1282Braineaged 40–41
|-
|width=auto| John II the Good1282–1309
| 
| c. 1265eldest son of Robert IV and Beatrice of Montfort
| (1) Joan of Montpensier1292five children(2) Perrenelle of SullyJanuary 1308one daughter
| c. 1309Braineaged 43–44
|-
|width=auto| Robert V1309–1329
| 
| c. 1293eldest son of John II and Joan of Montpensier
| Marie of EnghienApril 1321no issues
| 22 March 1329Braineaged 35–36
|-
|width=auto| John III1329–1331
| 
| c. 1295second son of John II and Joan of Montpensier
| Ida of Rosny1329no issues
| c. 1331Braineaged 35–36
|-
|width=auto| Peter I1331–1345
| 
| c. 1298third son of John II and Joan of Montpensier
| Isabeau de Melun1341one daughter
| 3 November 1345Braineaged 46–47
|-
|width=auto| Joan I1345–1346under the regency of Countess Isabeau
| 
| c. 1345Chateau de Gamachesonly daughter of Peter I and Isabeau de Melun
| never married
| c. 1346Braineaged 1
|-
|width=auto| Joan II1346–1355with Louis I
| 
| c. 1309only daughter of John II and Perrenelle of Sully
| Louis I of ThouarsThouars1330five children
| c. 1355aged 45–46
|-
|width=auto| Louis I1346–1355with Joan II
| 
| c. 1310Thouarseldest son of John I of Thouars and Blanche of Brabant
| (1) Joan II of DreuxThouars1330five children 
(2) Isabeau d'AvaugourThouarsJuly 1361no issues
| 7 April 1370Talmontaged 59–60
|}

House of Thouars

 1355-1365 : Simon (son of)
 1365-1377 : Péronelle (sister of)
 1365-1377 : Isabeau (sister of)
 1365-1377 : Margaret (sister of)

In 1377, the three sisters sold Dreux to the French crown.

House of Albret

 1382-1401 : Arnaud Amanieu (also lord of Albret)
 1401-1415 : Charles I (son of, also lord of Albret)
 1415-1471 : Charles II (son of, also lord of Albret)
 John IV (associated, also viscount of Tartas)
 1471-1522 : Alain - Alain the Great (son of)
 John V (associated)
 1522-1555 : Henry I (son of, also king of Navarre)
 1555-1572 : Jeanne (daughter of, also queen of Navarre)

House of Valois-Angoulême

|width=auto| Catherine1559–1569 
|  
| 13 April 1519Florenceonly daughter of Lorenzo II de' Medici, Duke of Urbino and Madeleine de La Tour d'Auvergne
| Henry II of FranceMarseille28 October 1533ten children
| 5 January 1589Château de Bloisaged 69
|-
|width=auto| Hercule-François1569–1584duc de Dreux
|  
| 18 March 1555Château de Fontainebleaufifth son of Henry II of France and Catherine
| never married
| 19 June 1584Château-Thierryaged 29
|}

House of Bourbon

|width=auto| Charles III1594–1612 
|  
| 3 November 1566Nogent-le-Rotrousixth son of Louis I de Bourbon, prince de Condé and Françoise d'Orléans-Longueville
| Anne de Montafié27 December 1601five children
| 1 November 1612Château de Blandyaged 45
|-
|width=auto| Louis III1612–1641 
|  
| 1 May 1604Hôtel de Soissonsonly son of Charles III and Anne de Montafié
| never married
| 6 July 1641Sedanaged 36
|-
|width=auto| Marie1641–1656 
|  
| 3 March 1606Hôtel de Soissonssecond daughter of Charles III and Anne de Montafié
| Thomas Francis, Prince of CarignanoParis6 January 1625 seven children
| 3 June 1692Hôtel de Soissonsaged 86
|}

House of Savoy-Carignano

|width=auto| Eugene Maurice, Count of Soissons1656–1673
|  
| 2 May 1635
Chambéry, Savoie, Rhone-Alpes, France
| Olympia ManciniParis21 February 1657eight children
| 6 June 1673Unnaaged 38
|-
|width=auto| Emmanuel Philibert of Carignano1673–1676
|  
| 16 October 1662fourth son of Eugene Maurice and Olympia Mancini
| never married
| 12 June 1676Turinaged 13
|}

House of Longueville

|width=auto| Marie1676–1707
|  
| 5 March 1625Pariseldest daughter of Henri II d'Orléans, duc de Longueville and Louise de Bourbon
| Henri II, Duke of NemoursTrie22 May 1657no issues
| 16 June 1707Parisaged 82
|}

House of Bourbon

|width=auto| Louis Joseph1707–1712
| 
| 1 July 1654Pariseldest son of Louis de Bourbon, Duke of Vendôme and Laura Mancini 
| Marie Anne de BourbonChateau de Sceaux21 May 1710no issues
| 11 June 1712Vinarosaged 57
|-
|width=auto| Marie Anne1712–1718
| 
| 24 February 1678Hôtel de Condéfifth daughter of Henri Jules de Bourbon, prince de Condé and Anne Henriette 
| Louis Joseph de Bourbon, Duke of VendômeChateau de Sceaux21 May 1710no issues
| 11 April 1718Hôtel de Vendômeaged 40
|}

House of Palatinate-Simmern

|width=auto| Anne Henriette1718–1723
| 
| 13 March 1648Parissecond daughter of Edward of the Palatinate-Simmern and Anna Gonzaga 
| Henri Jules de Bourbon, prince de CondéChateau de Sceaux11 December 1663ten children
| 23 February 1723Petit Luxembourgaged 74
|}

House of Bourbon

|width=auto| Anne Louise Bénédicte1723–1753
| 
| 8 November 1676Hôtel de Condéfourth daughter of Henri Jules de Bourbon, prince de Condé and Anne Henriette 
| Louis-Auguste de Bourbon, duc du MainePalace of Versailles19 May 1692seven children
| 23 January 1753Hôtel du Maineaged 76
|-
|width=auto| Louis Auguste1753–1755 
|  
| 4 March 1700Palace of Versaillessecond son of Louis-Auguste de Bourbon, duc du Maine and Anne Louise Bénédicte
| never married
| 1 October 1755Palace of Fontainebleauaged 55
|-
| Louis Charles1755–1775
|  
| 5 October 1701Château de Sceauxthird son of Louis-Auguste de Bourbon, duc du Maine and Anne Louise Bénédicte
| never married
| 13 July 1775Château de Sceauxaged 73
|-
|width=auto| Louis Jean Marie1775–1793 
|  
| 16 November 1725Château de Rambouilletonly son of Louis-Alexandre de Bourbon, comte de Toulouse and Marie Victoire de Noailles
| Maria Teresa d'EstePalace of Versailles29 December 1744seven children
| 4 March 1793Château de Bizyaged 67
|}

 
Dreux
French noble families
House of Capet